Sailors Don't Care may refer to:

 Sailors Don't Care (1928 film), a British comedy film directed by W.P. Kellino
 Sailors Don't Care (1940 film), a British comedy film directed by Oswald Mitchell